The CRAIC CR929, formerly known as Comac C929, is a planned long-range 250-to-320-seat wide-body twinjet airliner family to be developed by CRAIC, a joint-venture between Chinese Comac and Russian United Aircraft Corporation (UAC), to challenge the Airbus and Boeing duopoly. Construction of the first prototype began by September 2021.

Development

In June 2011, Comac was studying the 290-seat C929 and 390-seat C939 wide-body aircraft.
In June 2012, after assessing demand, Russia and China were to set up a joint venture between UAC and Comac to develop a successor to the Il-96. Development was expected to take at least seven years and cost $7–12 billion, with a production target of several hundred aircraft. Russia would contribute its knowledge and China would provide the resources.

In May 2014, a memorandum on cooperation was reached and a feasibility study completed in autumn 2014.
UAC estimated that wide-body demand worldwide through 2033 amounts to 8,000 aircraft, including 1,000 in China.
In February 2015 preliminary design had begun.
A nine-year, $13 billion development program was expected to be launched in 2016, targeting a 2025 introduction.
Comac was expected to develop and build the fuselage while UAC handles the composite wing and fin.

In June 2015, an agreement targeted a mid-2021 first flight, with certification and initial deliveries in 2024.
The airframe would be 50% composite and 15% titanium; UAC would deliver the first composite wings in 2019–2020.
In November 2015, a more fuel-efficient, re-engined version of the Ilyushin Il-96-400M was announced as a more attainable and affordable alternative.

In June 2016, an agreement was signed to set up a 50-50 joint venture.
In November 2016, at Zhuhai Airshow, Comac and UAC searched for suppliers and approached Honeywell and United Technologies.
A mock-up was exhibited at the show.

Comac and UAC estimated the development at 10 years, implying a first delivery in 2027 if the joint company was established and the program launched in 2017.

CRAIC joint venture 

The China-Russia Commercial Aircraft International Corporation Limited (CRAIC) 50-50 joint venture was launched on May 22, 2017 in Shanghai, targeting a 2025-2028 maiden flight and first delivery.
It aims to take 10% of a market dominated by Boeing and Airbus of 9,100 widebodies over 20 years through 2035, with a plane 10-15% cheaper to run.
Based in Shanghai where the assembly line will be located, CRAIC will oversee the program : technology development, manufacturing, marketing, sales, customer services, and program management.
The fuselage will be composite material, total investment will be $13–20 billion.

For 2023–45, UAC and Comac forecast a 7,000 widebodies demand for $1.5 trillion - an average of $ million, their goal for first delivery is 2027.
The 280 passengers capacity over 12,000 km is comparable to the Airbus A330-900.  With a nine-abreast economy seating, the short-fuselage model would seat 230 while the lengethened-fuselage model 320 pasengers.
Major suppliers will be picked among 169 companies by the end of 2018, as detailed design should be completed and a joint engineering center in Moscow with a branch in Shanghai will oversee development, employing around 100 engineers from both countries.
Comac's will be in charge of the fuselage sections, horizontal and vertical stabilizers, wing fairings, nose cone and landing gear; UAC will develop the composite wing, wing flap systems, engine pylons and main landing gear, with Chinese manufacture if it is cheaper.

China could see the joint venture involving joint financial investments, rather than an intellectual property sale, as Russia wants with the research and development center in Moscow and the aircraft manufacturing in Shanghai.
The main design center is in Russia and Shanghai will also have its own design office, for half of the work each.

In September 2017, it was named CR 929 (CR standing for China-Russia), concept approval was slated for 2017, early configuration and preliminary design for 2018, design documentation for 2021, first flight for 2023 and introduction for 2025.
It will be powered by a western engine at first before an indigenous power plant is developed between Russia's United Engine Corporation and China's AECC, to start testing in 2022 and be certificated in 2027.

Preliminary design 

Suppliers should be selected by 2018 to mid 2019.
A request for proposal for the propulsion system, including the engine and nacelle, have been issued on 21 December 2017, to be answered by 30 May 2018.
On May 15 at a Shanghai conference on aeroengines, the design grew to a  length,  shorter than the A330-900 but still with nine-abreast economy seating, requiring  of thrust from each engine.
GE produces the  GEnx-1B76, and Rolls-Royce the  Trent 1000 TEN.
CRAIC received seven proposals by the 30 May deadline.
The responding engine manufacturers appears to be Chinese AECC, General Electric, Rolls-Royce and Russian UEC, the three others were for related systems.

The general layout and principal geometry was approved on 6 June 2018: the wing span and shape, fuselage length, nose and tail dimensions, fins sizing and form, location of engines, landing gear and doors.
Within the same Gate 3, which should be completed by mid-2019, are experimental aerodynamics research, structural materials selection and technical analysis of supplied systems and equipment.

Comac plans to start construction in 2021, conduct the first flight in 2023 and make the first delivery in 2025, two years earlier than planned in November 2016.
It should be over 50% composite, maintain C919 cockpit commonality and have more electric systems including the environmental control, thrust reversal, braking and flight controls with gusts alleviation.
The eight-year schedule could be delayed by multinational management and is shorter than the Sukhoi Superjet 100 which took 11 years or the Comac ARJ21 in 13 years, as the Irkut MC-21 will have in 2020 or the C919 in 2021.
For three years from 2018, UAC plans to invest ₽ billion ($ million) for the CR929.

On 31 July 2018 was issued a request for proposals for the undercarriage, expecting a response from Europe, China or Russia by the end of November 2018.
Germany's Liebherr makes the C919 landing gear, Safran Landing Systems (formerly Messier-Bugatti-Dowty) supplies the A330 and A350 gear, Russian Hydromash builds the MC-21's, and Avic could bid, though less experienced.
The US-China trade war did not prevent bidding from UTC Aerospace Systems, which did not seek the contract and Canadian Héroux-Devtek has not received the RFP.
Leonardo-Finmeccanica was negotiating to set up a joint venture with Comac and the Chinese Kangde group before the end of October 2018, to produce the fuselage central section in Zhangjiagang for $10 billion until 2040.
Leonardo confirmed the joint venture on 26 October.

In November 2018, a mockup of the forward cabin was unveiled at the Zhuhai Airshow China.
UAC forecasts 8,000 airplanes worth $2.4 trillion over 20 years, with 20% of the demand from Russia and China, and out of a thousand aircraft, the CR929 may catch half of the sales: 250 in China, 50 in Russia plus from Southeast Asian countries.
The program cost is estimated at $13–15 billion by UAC and $20 billion by Comac for a break-even within fifteen years.
The vendor selection and draft design should be completed by the end of 2019.

Prototyping 
By December 2018, Comac produced the first composite forward fuselage prototype, a  structure, towards joint definition in the second half of 2019.
By early 2019, Concept design was targeted for the end of 2019/early 2020, before the definition phase.
Definition freeze was then aimed for the first half of 2022, first flight for 2025 and certification for 2027.
By spring 2019, progress was slowed by multinational cooperation challenges and engine selection was expected for September or October.
High-speed wind tunnel testing was completed by December 2019 at the Moscow Central Aerohydrodynamic Institute, using a 1:39 scale model of the fuselage and wing.

By July 2020, Irkut's chief disclosed that the first deliveries were delayed to 2028-2029, amid difficulties with Chinese partners cooperation.
From the Russian side, Maxim Litvinov was appointed as a chief designer, Chen Yingchun from the Chinese side. By June 2021, China and Russia appeared to have put differences aside in relation to future market share, and confirmed plans to start building a prototype in 2021 with maiden flight in 2023. Coronavirus has impacted the development pace, however construction of the first prototype began by September 2021. In 2022, following the Russian invasion of Ukraine, multiple sanctions gives further uncertainty to the venture.

Design 

The two-crew flightdeck looks like the Comac C919 with a five-screen EFIS and sidestick controls.
Composite materials and titanium should account for half of the structural weight.

Engines
A competitive widebody would initially need Western powerplants and onboard systems.
The aircraft would need a  thrust turbofan.
Initially, the engine is likely to be supplied by Rolls-Royce or General Electric, who already have products in this class.
CRAIC expects a TSFC better by at least 10%.

At the November 2014 Zhuhai Airshow, a later high-thrust joint turbofan was discussed between Avic Commercial Aircraft Engines and United Engine Corporation (UEC), with parameters defined in early 2015 for an introduction between 2025 and 2030.
In September 2017, a memorandum of understanding was signed between Rostec's UEC and Aero Engine Corporation of China: initially joint research and customer requirements analysis and definition, then determining engine design and operating parameters before testing in 2022 and certification in 2027.

A more powerful version of the Aviadvigatel PD-14 developed for the Irkut MC-21 could be developed after its certification in 2017, with a 50% scaled up core.
In May 2016 began the development of a  Russian engine Aviadvigatel PD-35 for the twinjet, expected to enter service in 2025.
A derivative of the Kuznetsov NK-32 PD-30 powering the Tupolev Tu-160 supersonic bomber has also been proposed in August 2015.

China has been working independently on the CJ-2000 engine. Technically, it could also use AI-38 engines co-developed by China and Ukrainian Ivchenko-Progress from the 225 kN Progress D-18T of the An-124/An-225.
Although the MoU between Russian UEC and Chinese AECC makes this possibility unlikely. Meanwhile, any option to use western powerplants or onboard systems has been foreclosed by sanctions imposed in the wake of the 2022 Russian invasion of Ukraine, which prohibit sale, supply, transfer or export of aircraft and aircraft parts and technology to Russian entities.

Specifications

See also

References

External links
 
 COMAC America 
 

Comac aircraft
United Aircraft Corporation
Proposed aircraft of China
Proposed aircraft of Russia
Twinjets